Lacanobia aliena is a species of moth belonging to the family Noctuidae.

Synonyms:
 Noctua aliena Hübner, 1809 (= basionym)
 Mamestra amurensis Staudinger, 1901

References

Noctuidae